is the generic name of a great number of roads built during the Kamakura period which, from all directions, converged on the military capital of Kamakura, Kanagawa Prefecture, Japan. The term itself however was created probably during the Edo period to mean simply any old road going to Kamakura; it is used for example in the Fudokikō. The famous Tōkaidō highway which connects Kyoto to Kamakura can therefore also be considered a Kamakura Kaidō. Texts like the Taiheiki and the Azuma Kagami see things from a Kamakura-centric perspective and therefore use for the same roads individual names deriving from their destination, for example Kyōto Ōkan or the generic term .

The three main routes
Their course is well known because it's described in several medieval books. They ended at the Shinto gate (torii) at the entrance of Tsurugaoka Hachiman-gū in Kamakura. Like the other routes, these roads were built to allow quick army movements from and to Kamakura and were of great importance during the many internal wars of the period.

The Kamakura Kaidō/Ōkan network remained important during the Muromachi period (1336–1573) because Kamakura continued to be essential to control the Kantō region, however, after the last Kantō kubō Ashikaga Shigeuji was driven out of Kamakura and established himself in Shimōsa Province, the Later Hōjō clan supremacy made Kantō's political and economic center move to Odawara.  The final blow to the network was given by the Tokugawa, who in the 17th century made Edo their capital. With Kamakura's importance waning, the network fell in disrepair and in places disappeared.

Even though they are described in several old texts like the Azuma Kagami, the Taiheiki, the Gukanshō and the  the three roads' exact courses aren't known with certainty, and their description can therefore vary considerably with the source. The following are considered the most likely.

The Kami no Michi 
For unknown reasons, this route appears to be what the Azuma Kagami calls Shimo no Michi.

The Naka no Michi 
The Naka no Michi departed from Tsurugaoka Hachiman-gū with a left turn and passed through the Kobukurozaka Pass, Yamanouchi, Ofuna, Kasama (within today's Yokohama), Nagaya, Futamatagawa, and Nakayama, finally joining the Kami no Michi there. In Kamakura this particular road is still known as Kamakura Kaidō.

The Shimo no Michi 
The Shimo no Michi was a branch of the Naka no Michi that departed before Tsurumi (within today's Yokohama), then crossed Maruko, Shibuya, Hatogaya, Yono, Iwatsuki, Iwatsuki, Koga, and Yūki, then reaching Utsunomiya.

Notes

References
 
 
 
 
 

Kamakura, Kanagawa
Road transport in Japan
History of Kanagawa Prefecture